Tyldesley is an electoral ward in Leigh, England. It forms part of Wigan Metropolitan Borough Council, as well as the parliamentary constituency of Leigh.

Councillors 
The ward is represented by three councillors: Stephen Hellier (Lab), Joanne Marshall (Lab), and Nazia Rehman (Lab).

References

Wigan Metropolitan Borough Council Wards